Local elections were held in the province of Zamboanga Sibugay of the Philippines, on May 9, 2022 as part of the 2022 general election. Voters selected candidates for all local positions: a municipal and city mayor, vice mayor and councilors, as well as members of the Sangguniang Panlalawigan, the governor, vice governor and representatives for the two Districts of Zamboanga Sibugay.

Coalition

Administration Coalition

Primary Opposition Coalition

Independent and Other Party Coalition

Provincial elections 
All incumbents are marked in Italics.

Governor 
Incumbent Governor Wilter Palma is term limited, and is prohibited from running for a fourth consecutive term. Palma opted to run for congress, and his party fielded his son Rep. Wilter "Sharky" Palma II, facing incumbent representative Dulce Ann Hofer.

Vice governor 
Incumbent Vice Governor Rey Andre Olegario is running for re-election.

Provincial board

1st District 

 Municipalities: Alicia, Buug, Diplahan, Imelda, Mabuhay, Malangas, Olutanga, Payao, Talusan

2nd District 

 Municipalities: Ipil, Kabasalan, Naga, Roseller Lim, Siay, Titay, Tungawan

Congressional elections

1st District 
Incumbent Representative Wilter "Sharky" Palma II is eligible for reelection for a third and last term but opted to run for Governor. His party fielded incumbent Governor Wilter Palma.

2nd District 
Incumbent Representative Dulce Ann Hofer is term limited, and is prohibited from running for a fourth consecutive term. Hofer opted to run for Governor and her party fielded her brother George "Jet" Hofer II.

Municipal elections

1st District

Alicia 
Incumbent Mayor Remberto Sotto is running for re-election.

Incumbent Vice Mayor Rhine Tan is running for re-election.

Buug 
Incumbent Mayor Dionesia Lagas is running for re-election.

Incumbent Vice Mayor Jonam Lagas is running for re-election.

Diplahan 
Incumbent Mayor Eric Palma is running for re-election.

Incumbent Vice Mayor Danilo Abico Sr. is eligible for re-election but opted to run for Councilor. His party fielded Ramil Villaruel as Vice Mayoral Candidate.

Imelda 
Incumbent Mayor Inday Roselyn Silva is term limited, and is prohibited from running for a fourth consecutive term. Silva opted to run for Vice Mayor and Her party Fielded Jerry Silva as Mayoral Candidate.

Incumbent Vice Mayor Ruth Roble is eligible for re-election but opted to run for Councilor. His party fielded Incumbent Mayor Inday Roselyn Silva as Vice Mayoral Candidate.

Malangas 
Incumbent Mayor Marcelo Baquial Jr. is running for re-election.

Incumbent Vice Mayor Roberto Intol is running for re-election.

Payao 
Incumbent Mayor Joeper Mendoza is eligible for re-election but opted to run for Councilor. His party fielded Incumbent Councilor Joshua Mendoza as Mayoral Candidate.

Incumbent Vice Mayor Joel Indino is running for re-election.

Mabuhay 
Incumbent Mayor Indaylou Caloñge is running for re-election.

Incumbent Vice Mayor Joval John Samonte is running for re-election.

Olutanga 
Incumbent Mayor Arthur Ruste Sr. is running for re-election.

Incumbent Vice Mayor Janie Bert 'Janjan' Gumba is running for re-election.

Talusan 
Incumbent Mayor Orlando Ramiso is eligible for re-election but opted to run for Vice Mayor. His party fielded Incumbent Vice Mayor Ralimson Ramiso as Mayoral Candidate.

Incumbent Vice Mayor Ralimson Ramiso is eligible for re-election but opted to run for Mayor. His party fielded Incumbent Mayor Orlando Ramiso as Vice Mayoral Candidate.

2nd District

Ipil 
Incumbent Mayor Inday Amy Olegario is running for re-election.

Incumbent Vice Mayor Ramses Troy Olegario is running for re-election.

Kabasalan 
Incumbent Mayor Katrina Balladares is running for re-election.

Incumbent Vice Mayor Luvly Grace Cainglet is eligible for re-election but opted to run for Mayor. Her Party fielded Incumbent SB Member Venus Alcantara.

Naga 
Incumbent Mayor Rino Delos Reyes is running for re-election.

Incumbent Vice Mayor Romeo Pantag is running for re-election unopposed.

Roseller T. Lim (Surabay) 
Incumbent Mayor Danilo Piodena is eligible for re-election but opted to run for Vice Mayor. His party fielded Incumbent Vice Mayor Michael Piodena as Mayoral Candidate.

Incumbent Vice Mayor Michael Piodena is eligible for re-election but opted to run for Mayor. His party fielded Incumbent Mayor Danilo Piodena as Vice Mayoral Candidate.

Siay 
Incumbent Mayor Jarvis Acosta is running for re-election.

Incumbent Vice Mayor Julius 'Jun-Jun' Acosta Jr. is running for re-election

Titay 
Incumbent Mayor Leonardo 'Bobong' Talania is running for re-election unopposed.

Incumbent Vice Mayor Elizer Yamaro is running for re-election unopposed.

Tungawan 
Incumbent Mayor Carlnan Climaco is running for re-election.

Incumbent Vice Mayor Ivan Balano is running for re-election.

References

External links 

 COMELEC official website

2022 Philippine local elections
May 2022 events in the Philippines